Green beer can refer to:

For rough or immature beer see Brewing.
For Miami University's celebratory day of drinking beer dyed green see Green Beer Day.